Smoke Hole was an unincorporated community located in Pendleton County, West Virginia, USA. It was in Smoke Hole Canyon and has since ceased to exist.

External links 
Smoke Hole West Virginia Post Office Photo
West Virginia Division of Culture and History Place Names List

References 

Unincorporated communities in West Virginia
Ghost towns in West Virginia
History of West Virginia